is a Japanese documentary made in 1971 by Noriaki Tsuchimoto. It is the first in a series of independent documentaries that Tsuchimoto made of the mercury poisoning incident in Minamata, Japan. Subsequent films in the series include The Shiranui Sea.

Film content
The film focuses on the residents of Minamata and nearby communities who suffered damage to their nervous systems, or who were born deformed, due to the ingestion of fish containing abnormal amounts of mercury released into the sea by a fertilizer factory owned by Chisso. It not only shows their current condition and the hardships borne by their families, but also the discrimination they had suffered from other Minamata residents, the insufficient response by Chisso, the slowness of government action, and the problems faced by victims who had not been officially designated as suffering from Minamata disease.

The victims director Tsuchimoto portrays range from fishermen and the elderly to children born with congenital Minamata disease. The disease ranges in severity and symptoms, manifesting differently in each person. The themes carried throughout these different stories include the immense love of the caretakers and the guardians for those suffering from Minamata disease, as well as worries about these victims’ futures when their families pass away. By showing how some families make the most out of their situation and that rehabilitation is possible, Tsuchimoto humanizes the people ostracized by the community because of their association with Minamata disease. The documentary takes the side of the victims in their struggle, but it also devotes much time to understanding their lifestyle, especially their traditions and their close relationship with the sea.

The main action of the last part of the film is the effort of victims and their supporters to buy shares of Chisso in small quantities so that they can attend the annual stockholders' meeting and confront the corporate leadership. The Minamata demonstrators aim to address the managers and directors of Chisso to no avail, resulting in the demonstrators crowding around the directors. Through heart-wrenching tirades, the demonstrators express their demands for recognition and reparations. It is through powerful scenes such as these that Tsuchimoto’s message of demanding justice is conveyed most effectively. With recent environmental disasters in mind such as the March 2011 Fukushima Daiichi nuclear disaster, Tsuchimoto’s documentary is still relevant and brings up the issues of lack of government and corporate responsibility.

Production 
As a student activist who identified as a Communist, Tsuchimoto was angered by Chisso, the government, and medical institutions for being complicit in the Minamata disease victims’ suffering (Yasuo, 1995). Having used cinema to portray the lives of Tokyo taxi drivers in his breakthrough film, On the Road, contributing to the Minamata disease victims’ struggle for recognition and reparations through cinema was a natural response for Tsuchimoto. Hence, Minamata: The Victims and Their World came to be without any funding from sponsors. Instead, producer Ryūtarō Takagi essentially crowdsourced funds to produce this documentary as well as future films in the series.

Upon criticism for not including any details on the medical aspects of the Minamata disease, Tsuchimoto, who had intended for Minamata: The Victims and Their World to be his only documentary on the disease, continued his documentary series with the films Minamata Disease: A Trilogy and The Shiranui Sea. New opportunities simultaneously arose: after the court ruling on the Minamata case in 1973, Tsuchimoto was able to use the Medical Faculty of Kumamoto University’s film intended for academic use, which had been mostly undisclosed during the time Minamata: The Victims and Their World was produced.

Reception
Minamata: The Victims and Their World screened at numerous film festivals and won several awards, including the Film Ducat at the Mannheim-Heidelberg International Film Festival. The critic Mark Cousins has programmed it as one of "ten documentaries that shook the world." Director Claude Lanzmann, who was invited by director Tsuchimoto to join the latter at a festival celebrating both directors’ works in Tokyo, May 1996, stated, “[…] Tsuchimoto is such a marvelous film-maker, such a rigorous creator, that I followed the film passionately, without ever losing the thread, …” which speaks to Tsuchimoto’s skill in bringing out the humanity of people and bringing their relationship with nature, in this case the sea, to life.

Versions
The original Japanese film is 167 minutes long. The version currently available on DVD with English subtitles is 120 minutes long and was first prepared by Tsuchimoto for international environmental conferences and film festivals.

See also
The Shiranui Sea

References

External links 
 

1971 films
1971 in the environment
Minamata disease
1971 documentary films
Documentary films about environmental issues
Documentary films about health care
Japanese documentary films
1970s Japanese-language films
Documentary films about politics
Mercury poisoning
Films directed by Noriaki Tsuchimoto
1970s Japanese films